Bushuikha is a rural locality (a station) in Komyanskoye Rural Settlement, Gryazovetsky District, Vologda Oblast, Russia. The population was 437 as of 2002.

Geography 
It is located 38 km northeast of Gryazovets (the district's administrative centre) by road. Bushuikha (village) is the nearest rural locality.

References 

Rural localities in Gryazovetsky District